Callicrates or Kallikrates was an ancient Greek architect active in the middle of the fifth century BC. He and Ictinus were architects of the Parthenon (Plutarch, Pericles, 13). An inscription identifies him as the architect of "the Temple of Nike" on the Acropolis of Athens (IG I3 35). The temple in question is either the amphiprostyle Temple of Athena Nike now visible on the site or a small-scale predecessor (naiskos) whose remains were found in the later temple's foundations. 

An inscription identifies Callicrates as one of the architects of the Classical circuit wall of the Acropolis (IG I3 45), and Plutarch further states (loc. cit.) that he was contracted to build the Middle of three amazing walls linking Athens and Piraeus.

A crater on the planet Mercury was named in his honor.

References

Sources
Plutarch, Pericles 13

5th-century BC architects
Ancient Greek architects
5th-century BC Athenians
Parthenon
Year of birth unknown
Year of death unknown